Phacelia mutabilis is a species of flowering plant in the borage family known by the common name changeable phacelia. It is native to the western United States and Baja California, where it can be found in mountains and foothills, in forested and open habitat types, and deserts.

It is a perennial herb growing mat-like, decumbent, or upright with hairy stems reaching 60 centimeters in maximum length. The leaves have lance-shaped or oval blades which are sometimes divided into 3 segments. The inflorescence is a one-sided curving or coiling cyme of tubular to bell-shaped flowers. Each flower is about half a centimeter long and white, yellowish or purplish in color with long protruding stamens. It is surrounded by a calyx of elongated, hairy sepals.

External links
Phacelia mutabilis. Jepson eFlora.
Phacelia mutabilis. Burke Museum of Natural History and Culture. University of Washington.
Phacelia mutabilis. USDA PLANTS.
CalPhotos.

mutabilis
Flora of California
Flora of Nevada
Flora of Oregon
Flora of the California desert regions
Flora of the West Coast of the United States
Flora of the Cascade Range
Flora of the Great Basin
Flora of the Klamath Mountains
Flora of the Sierra Nevada (United States)
Natural history of the California Coast Ranges
Flora without expected TNC conservation status